The Hoffman House Hotel is located in Port Washington, Wisconsin. It was added to the National Register of Historic Places in 1984. Currently, the building serves as a restaurant.

References

Hotel buildings on the National Register of Historic Places in Wisconsin
Buildings and structures in Ozaukee County, Wisconsin
Restaurants in Wisconsin
Queen Anne architecture in Wisconsin
Sandstone buildings in the United States
National Register of Historic Places in Ozaukee County, Wisconsin